Vitalij Lux (born 27 February 1989) is a professional footballer who plays as a forward for Landesliga Bayern-Südost club TuS Geretsried and the Kyrgyzstan national team. Lux holds both German and Kyrgyz citizenship, and has represented Kyrgyzstan internationally since 2015.

Early life
Lux was born in Kara-Balta, Soviet Union, but was raised in Ulm, Germany, where he moved to when he was six years old.

Club career
Lux scored his first goal for SpVgg Unterhaching, in a 6–0 win against FC Augsburg II.

He helped Unterhaching get to the final of the 2015–16 Bavarian Cup, scoring a brace in the quarter finals against Seligenporten, and another two goals in the semifinals against Jahn Regensburg.

International career
Lux was called up in May 2015 by Aleksandr Krestinin to represent Kyrgyzstan national football team in the 2018 FIFA World Cup Qualifiers against Bangladesh and Australia. He made his debut in a 3–1 victory against Bangladesh, playing the full match.

Lux helped Kyrgyzstan reach their first major tournament, the 2019 AFC Asian Cup, where they reached the Round of 16.

Career statistics

International

International goals
Score and Result lists Kyrgyzstan goals first.

References

External links
 
 

1989 births
Living people
Association football forwards
Kyrgyzstan international footballers
Kyrgyzstani footballers
German people of Kyrgyzstani descent
Kyrgyzstani people of German descent
Citizens of Germany through descent
German footballers
People from Kara-Balta
Soviet emigrants to Germany
FC Carl Zeiss Jena players
1. FC Nürnberg players
SpVgg Unterhaching players
SSV Ulm 1846 players
Regionalliga players
3. Liga players
2019 AFC Asian Cup players